The Return of the Regulator is the fourth studio album by Warren G. The album can be considered a return to the roots of west coast gangsta music, but it sold less than the rapper's two previous albums.

Track listing

Samples
Ghetto Village
 "Village Ghetto Land" By Stevie Wonder

Credits
 Warren G: Drum programming, tracking, executive producer
 Andrew Gouche: Bass
 Craig Brockman, Scott Storch, Theron Feemster: Keyboards
 Mike Elizondo, Marlon Williams: Guitar
 Val Young, Traci Brown-Bailey *aka* TrayBlack: Background vocals
 Booker T. Jones: Tracking, engineering
 Mauricio "Veto" Iragorri: tracking, engineering
 Rich Travali: mixing
 Dr. Dre: mixing
 Brian Gardner: mastering
 Kevin Law: executive producer
 Derek "LA" Jackson: executive producer
 Jonathan Mannion: photography
 Cey Adams: art direction & design
 Tonya Blackstone: art direction & design

Charts

References

2001 albums
Warren G albums
Albums produced by Dr. Dre
Albums produced by Soopafly
Albums produced by Warren G
G-funk albums